Charles Moses (born 12 March 1954) is a Ghanaian sprinter. He competed in the men's 400 metres at the 1984 Summer Olympics.

References

1954 births
Living people
Athletes (track and field) at the 1984 Summer Olympics
Ghanaian male sprinters
Olympic athletes of Ghana
Place of birth missing (living people)